Falospongia is a genus of sponge made up of radiating fronds, known from the Middle Cambrian Burgess Shale. Its name is derived from the Latin fala ("scaffold") and spongia ("sponge"), referring to the open framework of the skeleton. It superficially resembles Haplistion but is monaxial. 5 specimens of Falospongia are known from the Greater Phyllopod bed, where they comprise under 0.1% of the community.

References

External links
 

Burgess Shale fossils
Protomonaxonida
Burgess Shale sponges
Prehistoric sponge genera
Cambrian genus extinctions